Mbéré  is a department of Adamawa Province in Cameroon.
The department covers an area of 14,267 km and as of 2001 had a total population of 185,473. The capital of the department lies at Meinganga.

Subdivisions
The department is divided administratively into arrondissements and communes and in turn into villages.

 Dir
 Djohong
 Meiganga
 Ngaoui

References

Departments of Cameroon
Adamawa Region